The African Cup of Champions Clubs 1974 was the 10th edition of the annual international club football competition held in the CAF region (Africa), the African Cup of Champions Clubs. It determined that year's club champion of association football in Africa.

The tournament was played by 26 teams and used a knock-out format with ties played home and away. CARA Brazzaville from the People's Republic of the Congo won the final, becoming CAF club champion for the first time and the first team from that country to win the trophy.

First round

|}
1

Second round

|}
1 
2

Quarter-finals

|}

Semi-finals

|}

Final

Champion

Top scorers
The top scorers from the 1974 African Cup of Champions Clubs are as follows:

External links
African Cup of Champions results at Rec.Sport.Soccer Statistics Foundation

1
African Cup of Champions Clubs